Jack Dalziel Smith  (born 19 June 1991) in Stockton-on-Tees is a British wheelchair rugby athlete and member of the Great Britain national wheelchair rugby team where the team won the final on the 29th August 2021 and received gold medals. He was chosen to represent Great Britain at the 2020 Summer Paralympics in Tokyo.

Biography 
In 2008, at age 16, Jack was diagnosed with Hodgkin Lymphoma. A few weeks after this diagnosis, while playing rugby for Billingham RUFC he was injured in a ruck incident. Jack sustained a fracture-dislocation of several vertebrae and spinal cord compression, which resulted in paralysis from the chest down. 
He had spinal surgery at North Tees Hospital and spent three months' rehab at James Cook University Hospital spinal unit.

Just over a year later and Jack was back playing rugby, only this time in a wheelchair. He took up the sport in 2009 at the North East Bulls club, the region's only wheelchair team.

Jack moved on to Leicester Tigers Wheelchair Rugby club, and through many years hard work and dedication, to a place in the Great Britain team.
Following his selection for the GBWR team Jack said: "This has been my dream for six or seven years and right now I'm so excited.  My parents, brother, sister and my girlfriend have been so supportive and, although it's not possible for them to watch, they are over the moon for me."

Smith was appointed Member of the Order of the British Empire (MBE) in the 2022 New Year Honours for services to wheelchair rugby.

References

1991 births
Living people
British disabled sportspeople
Paralympic wheelchair rugby players of Great Britain
Wheelchair rugby players at the 2020 Summer Paralympics
Sportspeople from Stockton-on-Tees
Medalists at the 2020 Summer Paralympics
Paralympic gold medalists for Great Britain
Sportspeople from County Durham
Members of the Order of the British Empire